Glaiza Herradura-Agullo (born February 24, 1978) is a Filipino former child actress. She was the first-ever grand winner of the Little Miss Philippines segment of Eat Bulaga! in 1984. She starred in RPN-9's television series Heredero with Manilyn Reynes and Richard Arellano. She won the 1988 FAMAS Best Child Actress award for her role in Batas Sa Aking Kamay starring Fernando Poe, Jr.

Filmography

Television

Movies
Tupang Itim (1989)
Final Reprisal (1988)
Afuang (1988)
Batas sa Aking Kamay (1987)
Mga Anghel ng Diyos (1986)
Paano Hahatiin ang Puso (1986)
Bagong Hari (1986)
Kay Dali Ng Kahapon, Ang Bagal ng Bukas (1985)

Awards and nominations
1990 Nominated FAMAS Award Best Child Actress Tupang Itim (1989)
1989 Nominated FAMAS Award Best Child Actress Afuang (1988)
1988 Won FAMAS Award Best Child Actress Batas Sa Aking Kamay (1987)
1987 Nominated FAMAS Award Best Child Actress Paano Hahatiin ng Puso (1986)
1984 Grand winner of Little Miss Philippines

Personal life
Herradura married Bryant Agullo on March 5, 2002. They have two children together.

References

External links

1978 births
Living people
That's Entertainment Thursday Group Members
That's Entertainment (Philippine TV series)
Filipino child actresses
People from Cavite City
Actresses from Cavite
Radio Philippines Network personalities